Lofi Girl (formerly ChilledCow) is a French YouTube channel and music label established in 2017. It provides livestreams of lo-fi hip hop music 24/7, accompanied by a Japanese-style animation of a girl studying or relaxing.

History 
The YouTube channel "ChilledCow" was created by Dimitri on 18 March 2015. ChilledCow began streaming lo-fi hip hop music, branding it as relaxation music for those who are working or studying on 25 February 2017. The live stream was taken down by YouTube between July and August 2017 for using footage of the character Shizuku Tsukishima studying from the animated film Whisper of the Heart (1995). The livestream was later reinstated with a custom animation of a girl studying.

The music used in ChilledCow's live streams were either released through the ChilledCow label or were given permission to use by another artist. In February 2020, YouTube briefly removed the channel without explanation, but reinstated it after a public backlash. The original live stream that was stopped by the take-down was 13,000 hours long, making it one of the longest videos on YouTube.

On 18 March 2021, six years after the creation of the channel, it was announced that the channel would rebrand from ChilledCow to Lofi Girl. The YouTube community posts explained how Lofi Girl had become the icon of the channel, and that it would fit as the new channel name.

On 2 February 2022, the channel reached the milestone of ten million subscribers. The stream that was on at the time had been running since 22 February 2020, and had over seven million likes. The channel celebrated this by having a party event in the chat.

On 10 July 2022, YouTube took down two of the channel's streams ("beats to relax/study to" and "beats to chill/sleep to") after receiving a Digital Millennium Copyright Act takedown request from Malaysian record label FMC Music Sdn Bhd. The two streams had nearly 800 million combined views and had been streaming continuously for about 21,000 hours each. YouTube later confirmed that the copyright infringement claims were "abusive" and that the claimant's channel had been terminated. Lofi Girl resumed streaming on 12 July. According to a spokesman for FMC Music, the copyright claims were filed by hackers who had gained access to the company's YouTube account. Following the incident, Lofi Girl criticized YouTube for not investigating the claims more thoroughly and for not providing content creators an opportunity to appeal false claims.

Character 

Lofi Girl streams are accompanied by an animation of a girl studying or relaxing who has come to be known as the Lofi Girl, the Lofi Study Girl, or the "24/7 lofi hip hop beats" girl (officially named Jade). The channel began using the Lofi Girl for its streams in March 2018.

Dimitri originally used the character Shizuku Tsukishima from the Studio Ghibli film Whisper of the Heart (1995) as the face of the channel, with footage of her studying or writing used in the streams. When the popularity of the streams ultimately led to the channel being taken down for copyright violations, Dimitri decided to maintain the Ghibli-esque aesthetic but with an original character and put out a call for artists.

One of the artists who responded was Juan Pablo Machado. In September 2018, during his last year of his master's degree, he decided to respond to a call for tenders received by his school. The tender from ChilledCow called for a "student busy revising for her classes, with Miyazaki-esque visuals." Machado, who was not previously familiar with the lo-fi aesthetic, decided to send in his sketches. Several positions were tested for the Lofi Girl, including a lying position, at the end of which she would return to her initial position; this did not carry over into the final product because it took too long to animate. The background was originally plain black in order to save animation time, but Machado eventually decided to place La Croix-Rousse in the window instead.

Reception 
Lofi Girl's viewership has grown ever since the start of the live stream. Fareid El Gafy from Washington Square News praised the live stream about studying, saying "Thanks to this playlist, I've cranked out a multitude of essays, study sessions, scripts and rough cuts to the tune of pop culture samples, muted snares and artificial record scratches." Xavier Piedra of Mashable praised it for its relaxing songs that keep the listener focused. He also noted that the playlist is updated frequently and often contains a mixture of old and newly added songs. The live stream was the first live stream listed on Cassidy Quinn of KGWs "Top 10 non-news live channels to watch on YouTube while social distancing". Quinn described the songs in the live stream as "a constant stream of low-key music you play in the background while you get work done, do chores, whatever you're doing at home right now". ChilledCow's lofi hip-hop playlist was also named the best lo-fi beats playlist by Red Bull. In 2021, The A.V. Club claimed that lo-fi beats to relax and study "turns the average person into a superhuman academic whose powers of concentration are rivaled only by headphone-wearing cartoon girls sitting at their desks during rainy days", while Rolling Stone said that "Lo-fi's slow, smooth beats aren't just for studying and working. They represent the revenge of producers who have found a way to put their talent to good use in difficult times." During the COVID-19 pandemic, Dazed Digital writer Sophia Atkinson referred to Lofi Girl as a "social distancing role model", it seemingly being "crystal clear that the anime girl was always operating in a post-coronavirus reality".

In popular culture 
The character quickly went viral, and was established as an Internet meme. She has been referenced in popular culture. An example is contained within Steven Universe Future, where the character Connie is depicted studying in the same pose and environment as the Girl. In September 2020, a trend started on Reddit whereby the Lofi Girl would be redrawn to match the context of a certain country or place. Will Smith has also published his own version, replacing the study girl with Smith wearing a Bel-Air hoodie.

In 2019, a similar YouTube channel named "College Music" partnered with McCann London, Vice Media, and Samaritans to create a PSA promoting mental health awareness that starred a character similar to Lofi Girl. Titled "what happened to our study girl?", it initially depicted her studying before suddenly having a stress-induced mental breakdown, and considers committing suicide with a knife before ultimately deciding against it. The video ends with a message imploring people struggling with suicidal thoughts to seek help, with the video providing links and numbers of various hotlines. College Music said they were inspired to make the PSA after noticing that an increasing number of users were using the channel's live chat box to talk about the stress they're going through, and that a small number admitted to having suicidal thoughts. McCann chief creative officer said they went with the partnership because "If students are using these lo-fi channels as chat forums to talk about suicide and stress – then this seemed like the perfect place to offer support".

To promote the release of the new expansion Shadowlands, the official YouTube account for MMORPG World of Warcraft posted a Warcraft-themed parody of Lofi Girl's "Lofi beats to relax/study to" stream. Youtooz released a one-foot-tall replica of the lo-fi anime girl, complete with a desk and school supplies. In 2022, Disney released a compilation album of lofi remakes of Disney songs. The album was promoted as having been compiled by Minnie Mouse, and critics pointed out obvious influences from Lofi Girl. Italian rapper Tha Supreme released in the summer of 2022 an animated music video for the single , featuring a scene of the singer's anime-styled depiction drawn in the same setting and pose of Lofi Girl. In 2022, Paradox Development Studio released lofi versions of the soundtracks to their two most recent games, Crusader Kings 3 and Victoria 3, on YouTube. Both videos featured parodies of Lofi Girl based on the historical setting of the games.

Notes

References

External links 
 

Lo-fi musicians
 
Music YouTubers
YouTube channels launched in 2015
French record labels
Internet memes introduced in 2018